Akbarabad (also Romanized as Akbarābād) is a village in Barkuh Rural District, Kuhsorkh County, Razavi Khorasan Province, Iran. At the 2006 census, its population was 231, in 68 families.

See also 

 List of cities, towns and villages in Razavi Khorasan Province

References 

Populated places in Kuhsorkh County